Arus Mahalleh may refer to:
 Arus Mahalleh, Rudsar